William Anthony may refer to:

 William Anthony (USMC) (1853–1899), U.S. Army soldier and United States Marine who served during the Spanish–American War
 William Anthony (artist) (born 1934), American painter and illustrator
 William Anthony (bookbinder) (1926–1989), Irish-American bookbinder
 William Anthony (judge) (c. 1752–1832), justice of the Rhode Island Supreme Court
 William Arnold Anthony (1835–1908), U.S. physicist

See also